Saint John's School is a K-12 school (Pre-Kinder to 4EM in Chile) located in San Pedro de la Paz, Concepción, Chile.

Buildings and structures in Biobío Region
Educational institutions established in 1942
Schools in Biobío Region
1942 establishments in Chile